Hypsilurus nigrigularis is a species of agamid lizard. It is found in New Guinea.

Hypsilurus nigrigularis is hunted by the Kalam people of Papua New Guinea, and its eggs are also consumed. The Kalam consider it to be a totemic animal.

Names
It is known as aypot in the Kalam language of Papua New Guinea.

Behavior and habitat
Hypsilurus nigrigularis is an arboreal frugivorous skink that feeds on the fruits of Wendlandia paniculata, Schefflera sp., Evodia sp., Macaranga sp., Rubus spp., and other species.

References

nigrigularis
Reptiles described in 1874
Taxa named by Adolf Bernhard Meyer
Agamid lizards of New Guinea
Endemic fauna of New Guinea